Ta Shui Wan was a bay in Yam O, Lantau Island, New Territories, Hong Kong, located between Tai Yam Teng and Ngong Shuen Au. The bay was reclaimed to construct MTR Sunny Bay station.

Ta Shui Wan Ferry Pier was a ferry pier in Ta Shui Wan that provided ferry service to Tsing Lung Tau, Tsuen Wan. It was demolished as part of the land reclamation works.

The reclaimed land was renamed Sunny Bay under the requirement of the Walt Disney Company, the operator of Hong Kong Disneyland. Thus, the MTR station that was built there was called Sunny Bay station to fit the name change.

Hong Kong International Airport is located a couple of kilometers away, to the west.

References

Bays of Hong Kong
Yam O